J.J. Gould is a Canadian journalist, the founder and editor of The Signal, and a member of the editorial advisory board for The Washington Monthly. He is a former editor of The New Republic, digital editor at The Atlantic, and staff editor at the Journal of Democracy.

References 

The Atlantic (magazine) people
Living people
Journalists from Nova Scotia
Year of birth missing (living people)
The New Republic people